Quiegolani Zapotec (Western Yautepec Zapotec) is a Zapotec language of Oaxaca, Mexico.

See also 
Santa María Quiegolani

References

Bibliography

Further reading

 

Zapotec languages